Knud Torben Christensen (born 19 December 1949), better known by his stage name Sebastian, is a Danish singer, guitarist and composer. 
Starting as a musician in the late 1960s he is still active and very popular. So far his career has spanned four decades.
Having worked in the folk genre, he has become one of the most prominent pop/rock musicians in Denmark and has scored numerous films and plays. Since the 1990s he has primarily worked with Danish musicals, with great success.

Discography

Albums 
 The Goddess (1971)
 Den store flugt (1972)
 Over havet under himlen (1973)
 Blød lykke (1974)
 Gøgleren, Anton og de andre (1975)
 Måske ku' vi (1976)
 Ulvehøjen (1977)
 Ikke alene Danmark (1978)
 Tiderne skifter (1979)
 Cirkus fantastica (1979)
 Nattergalen (1980)
 Stjerne til støv (1981)
 80'ernes boheme (1983)
 Tusind og een nat (1984)
 Skatteøen (1986)
 På vulkaner (1987)
 Det gode menneske fra Sezuan (1988)
 Et eventyr (1989)
 Piratpladen (1990)
 Miraklernes tid (1990)
 Ronja Røverdatter (1991)
 Gøngehøvdingen (1992)
 Cyrano (1993)
 Aladdin (1995)
 Hans Christian Andersen (1996)
 Pippi (1998)
 Den nye Cyrano (2000)
 Klokkeren fra Notre Dame (2002)
 Øjeblikkets Mester (2011)
 I Danmark er jeg født (2012)
 Hodja fra pjort- Sangene (2014)
 Sange til Drømmescenariet (2017)

Compilation albums 
 Grænseløs Greatest (1999)
 De Bedste Sange (2015)

Cinema
Works by Sebastian appear in these films:
1973	Rapportpigen
1976	Måske ku' vi
1978	Du er ikke alene
1980	Krigernes børn
1983	De uanstændige
1984	Hodja fra Pjort
1999	Klinkevals
2000	Juliane Jensen

Television
Works by Sebastian appear in these television series:
1984	Øbberbøv (Title Song)
1987	Nana (Title Song)
1992	Gøngehøvdingen (Film music)
1998	Vip & Victor (Introduction)
2001	Klinkevalsen (Film music)

Live/compilation albums
First Time Around
Når lyset bryder frem
Flyv lykkefugl
Her er en sang & 20 andre
26 hits
Den danske sang
De-ja-vu
Hjerternes sange, roser & torne – 75 bedste sange (The best 75 songs) (4-cd box)
Romeoserenader
Sebastian & Band – Live
Sebastian i Montmatre – Live
Sebastian (Norwegian version of Ulvehøjen)
Skatteøen
Pippi
Skatten på Sjørøverøya – Norwegian artist
Ronja Røverdatter – Iceland – Icelandic artist
Ronja Røverdatter – Norwegian – Norwegian artist
Cyrano
Pippi – Israel – Israeli artister
Pippi – Spain – Spanish artist

Albums released in cooperation with another artist
Lis Sørensen: Stille før storm, Fuld af nattens stjerner, Hjerternes sang, Dyndkongens datter
Sissel Kyrkjebø: Vårvise, Grænseløs
Marianne Mortensen: Så blidt til stede, Kærlighedens veje
Majbritte Ulrikkeholm: Verdens stærkeste pige, Tingfindersangen
Susanne Elmark: Klinkevals
Lone Kellerman: Den sidste vals
Flemming Bamse Jørgensen: De engelske dyder, Piratsangen
Lars H.U.G: Det sorte tegn, Rose
Steffen Brandt: Find ham, Kling og Klang
Eddie Skoller: Pruttesangen
Søs Fenger: Naboerne, Ulvesangen.
Michael Falch: Brødre skal vi dele
Peter Thorup: Den flyvende hollænder
Michael Bundesen: Mattissang
Rebekka Bruel: Kom hjem til mig
Blå Øjne: Romeo

References

External links

 Official website 
 
 Biography from the Royal Library 
 Biography at bandlist.dk 
 Interview and background from Dagbladenes Bureau 

1949 births
Living people
Danish male singer-songwriters
Danish pop singers
20th-century Danish male singers
21st-century Danish male singers